Ripogenites is a genus of beetles in the family Carabidae, containing the following species:

 Ripogenites gigas Basilewsky, 1954
 Ripogenites obsoletus Basilewsky, 1954

References

Lebiinae